Alonso Perez de Leon (Ciudad de Mexico, 30 August 1608 – Valle del Pilón, 17 July 1661) was a New Spanish conquistador, explorer of eastern Nuevo León and a man of letters.

References 

1608 births
1661 deaths
Spanish conquistadors
People of New Spain
People from Mexico City
History of Mexico